Lanang Tapodoc Ali Jr. is a Filipino politician and lawyer who is a member of the interim Bangsamoro Parliament. He is also the Majority Leader of the regional parliament.

Background
Ali was born in Sultan Kudarat, Maguindanao. He obtained both his bachelor's degree in political science and law degree at the Lyceum of the Philippines University.

Legal career
As a lawyer he represented the Moro Islamic Liberation Front.

Bangsamoro Parliament
Ali ran unopposed for the position of Majority leader of the Bangsamoro Transition Authority Parliament and was elected to the position on March 29, 2019. At the beginning of the 2nd interim parliament on September 12, 2022, Ali was re-elected again as Majority leader.

References

People from Maguindanao
Members of the Bangsamoro Transition Authority Parliament
Living people
Filipino Muslims
21st-century Filipino lawyers
Year of birth missing (living people)
Lyceum of the Philippines University alumni